The men's 49er class at the 2014 ISAF Sailing World Championships was held in Santander, Spain 16–21 September.

Results

References

!
49er & 49er FX World Championships